Bast Nari (also Romanized as Bast Nārī) is a village in Mahur Rural District, Mahvarmilani District, Mamasani County, Fars Province, Iran. At the 2006 census, its population was 61, in 14 families.

References 

Populated places in Mamasani County